Zhu Zanjin (Chinese: 朱贊錦 ; pinyin: Zhū Zàn Jǐn) (born on 16 September 1995) is a Chinese actor and dancer and graduated from Beijing Normal University with a major in dance. He made his debut as an actor in the 2015 television series Demon Girl. Since then he has appeared in a number of other film and television productions, including the 2018 xianxia drama The Untamed in which he played the character of Jin Guangyao. He reprised this role in the 2020 spin-off film Fatal Journey.

Selected filmography

Television series

Film

References

External links
 
 

Living people
21st-century Chinese male actors
Chinese male television actors
Chinese male film actors
Male actors from Hainan
1995 births